Petra Platen (born 7 November 1959) is a German handball player who played for the West German national team. She was born in Moers. She represented West Germany at the 1984 Summer Olympics in Los Angeles, where the West German team placed fourth.

References

External links

1959 births
Living people
Sportspeople from Düsseldorf (region)
German female handball players
Olympic handball players of West Germany
Handball players at the 1984 Summer Olympics
People from Moers